Events from the year 1705 in Canada.

Incumbents
French Monarch: Louis XIV
English, Scottish and Irish Monarch: Anne

Governors
Governor General of New France: Philippe de Rigaud Vaudreuil
Governor of Acadia: Jacques-François de Monbeton de Brouillan
Colonial Governor of Louisiana: Jean-Baptiste Le Moyne de Bienville
Governor of Plaisance: Daniel d'Auger de Subercase

Events
 Jacques Raudot becomes co-Intendant of New France with his son Antoine-Denis Raudot.
 Anthony Beale was appointed governor of the Hudson's Bay Company for Canada, replacing John Fullartine.

Deaths
 Louis Hennepin, Récollet missionary, explorer (born 1626)

References

 
Canada
05